is a Japanese politician of the Democratic Party of Japan, a member of the House of Councillors in the Diet (national legislature), from Niigata Prefectural electorate. He is a native of Kanazawa, Ishikawa and graduate of Keio University.

When he married Makiko Tanaka he changed his family name to hers. He was elected to the House of Representatives for the first time in 1983. After losing his seat in 1996, he was elected to the House of Councillors for the first time in 1998.

References
 
 Profile, dpj.or.jp

External links
 Official website 

1940 births
Democratic Party of Japan politicians
Keio University alumni
Living people
Members of the House of Councillors (Japan)
Members of the House of Representatives (Japan)
People from Kanazawa, Ishikawa
Spouses of Japanese politicians
Japanese defense ministers